4340 steel is an ultra-high strength steel classified a medium-carbon, low-alloy steel. 4340 steel has high strength, ductility, toughness, creep resistance, and fatigue resistance relative to most other steels. High degrees of hardenability are achievable in the alloy, with HRC hardnesses ranging from 24 to 53 depending on the heat treatment.

Chemical Composition

Mechanical Properties 
The mechanical properties of 4340 are highly dependent on the heat treatment. 4340 can commonly have yield strengths of 740-1860 MPa, tensile strengths of 860-1980 MPa, elongations of 11-23%, and plane strain fracture toughness of 53-110 MPa√m.

Common applications of 4340 steel are aircraft, automotive systems and hydraulic systems.

Equivalent Grades

References

Steels